Shuko Aoyama and Rika Fujiwara were the defending champions, but Fujiwara chose not to participate. Aoyama partnered up with Mari Tanaka, but lost in the quarterfinals to Han Xinyun and Sun Shengnan.

Hsieh Shu-ying and Hsieh Su-wei won the title, defeating Liu Wanting and Xu Yifan in the final, 6–3, 6–2.

Seeds

Draw

Draw

References
 Main Draw*

ITF Women's Circuit - Wenshan - Doubles